Mishmash is a confused or disorderly mixture of things, a hodgepodge.

Mishmash or mish mash may also refer to:

 Mish-mash (food), a Bulgarian dish
 Mish Mash!, a 2004 rock album by Regurgitator
 Mish Mash (band), a UK electronic dance music group
 Mish-Mash, a fictional character from The Brave Little Toaster

See also 

 Mischmasch, a periodical written by Lewis Carroll
 Michmash, a Biblical town
Mish (disambiguation) 
Mash (disambiguation)
Mashed (disambiguation)
Masher (disambiguation)
Mashup (disambiguation)
 Mich Mich (disambiguation)
 Mishmish (disambiguation)